Winterbourne are an Australian duo consisting of James Draper and Jordan Brady.

History

2014–2017: Formation
The duo released their debut EP in May 2014, which made the ARIA Charts at number 100 in April 2015, following a national tour. In May 2017, the duo released their second EP titled Pendulum, which peaked at number 23 on the ARIA Charts.

2018-2019: "Better"
In September 2018, Winterbourne released "Better"; the first offering from their forthcoming album, Echo of Youth, released later in 2019.

Discography

Studio albums

Extended plays

Singles

References

Australian musical duos
Australian pop music groups